Francesco Leonardi was an Italian chef and food author, born in Rome, and active in the 18th century in several European countries. 

He concluded his career as chef of Empress Catherine II of Russia. Back in Rome, he wrote the cookbook L'Apicio moderno, ("Modern Apicius") in six volumes, first edited in 1790. In the book's introduction Leonardi sketches the first historic survey of the Italian cuisine, from the Roman age through the golden age of the Renaissance until the 18th century. He also shows a profound knowledge of international cuisines, including Russian, Polish, Turkish, German, English and French cuisines. At the end of the book, a glossary of French culinary terms evidences his awareness of the state of the Italian cuisine, at that time heavily dependent on French cuisine. Leonardi also portrays a vast list of the wines in the sixth volume. 

The first Chef to regularly use tomatoes in his work, Leonardi claimed the invention of the classic tomato sauce for pasta.

Sources

References 

1700s births
Italian chefs
Italian food writers
Writers from Rome
Year of death missing